Sarvabhouma is a 2004 Indian Kannada language drama film starring Shiva Rajkumar, Mayuri, Shilpa Anand, Sharath Lohitashwa, Rangayana Raghu and Vikram Ravichandran. It is directed by Mahesh Sukhadhare and music by Hamsalekha. Shivaraj Kumar played the double role, including the lead role.

Cast
Shiva Rajkumar as Subhash Chandra / Jeeva
Mayuri as Basanthi
Ohanna Shivanand (credited as Shilpa Shivanand) as Anju, a television journalist
Sumithra as Anju's mother 
Sharath Lohitashwa as Wasim Akram, Union Minister of Home Affairs
Sharan
Rangayana Raghu as Jayaraj
Vikram Ravichandran as young Jeeva

Soundtrack 
All songs were written and composed by Hamsalekha.

Critical reception 
The Hindu wrote "Some jingoism and lot of yarns". However Sify praised the director that he "has handled the story with all seriousness".

References 

2004 films
2000s crime action films
Indian crime drama films
Indian action drama films
Films about terrorism in India
Indian prison films
Films about rape in India
2000s Kannada-language films
India–Pakistan relations in popular culture
Indian crime action films
Films about kidnapping in India
Films scored by Hamsalekha
2004 crime drama films